Year 956 (CMLVI) was a leap year starting on Tuesday (link will display the full calendar) of the Julian calendar.

Events 
 By place 
 Byzantine Empire 
 Summer – Emperor Constantine VII appoints Nikephoros Phokas to commander of the Byzantine field army (Domestic of the Schools) in the East. He gives him order to prepare a campaign against the Hamdanid emir Sayf al-Dawla. Constantine makes treaties with neighbouring rulers, to seek military aid.
 September - October – A Byzantine fleet under Basil Hexamilites deals a crushing defeat to the Hamdanid fleet at Tarsus in Cilicia (modern Turkey).

 Europe 
 Liudolf, the eldest son of King Otto I (the Great), reconciles with his father and asks again for installation as duke of Swabia. Otto refuses, but at the instigation of his uncle Bruno I (duke of Lotharingia) allows Liudolf to lead an expedition to Italy to bring the vassal Berengar of Ivrea to heel. 
 Berengar of Ivrea dispatches a Lombard army under his son Adalbert II to counter Liudolf, while he guards Pavia himself. In two battles Liudolf defeats the Lombard forces and enters Pavia, there to receive the homage of the Italian nobles and clergy on behalf of Otto I.
 June 16 – Hugh the Great, count of Paris, dies at Dourdan. He is succeeded by his eldest son Hugh Capet, who is recognized as Duke of the Franks by his cousin Lothair III, king of the West Frankish Kingdom.
 King Ordoño III dies at Zamora after a 5-year reign. He is succeeded by his half-brother Sancho I as ruler of León (modern Spain).

 Egypt 
 An earthquake badly damages the Lighthouse of Alexandria: one of the Seven Wonders of the Ancient World.

 By topic 
 Religion 
 Dunstan, an abbot of Glastonbury Abbey, is sent into exile by King Eadwig. He takes refuge in Flanders (modern Belgium), where Count Arnulf I gives him shelter in the Abbey of Mont Blandin, near Ghent.

Births 
 Siegfried II, count of Stade (d. 1037)
probable
Adalbert of Prague, Bohemian bishop (approximate date)
Sampiro, Spanish bishop (approximate date)

Deaths 
 February 15 – Su Yugui, Chinese chancellor (b. 895)
 February 27 – Theophylact, Byzantine patriarch (b. 917)
 April 8 – Gilbert, duke of Burgundy
 April 15 – Lin Yanyu, Chinese court official and eunuch
 May 19 – Robert, archbishop of Trier
 June 4 – Muhammad III of Shirvan, Muslim ruler
 June 16 – Hugh the Great, Frankish nobleman (b. 898)
 July/August – Fulbert of Cambrai, bishop
 August – Ordoño III, king of León
 August 29 – Fu (the Elder), Chinese empress consort
 September/October – Al-Masudi, Muslim historian and geographer
 December 21 – Sun Sheng, Chinese chancellor
 December 26 – Wulfstan, archbishop of York
date unknown
Ahmad al-Muhajir, Muslim scholar and imam (b. 873)
Congalach Cnogba, High King of Ireland
Gandaraditya, ruler of Chola Kingdom
Zhao Hongyin, Chinese general

References